The white-backed black tit (Melaniparus leuconotus), also known as the white-backed tit, is a species of bird in the family Paridae.  It is found in Eritrea and Ethiopia.  Its natural habitat is boreal forests.

The white-backed black tit was formerly one of the many species in the genus Parus but was moved to Melaniparus after a molecular phylogenetic analysis published in 2013 showed that the members of the new genus formed a distinct clade.

References

white-backed black tit
Birds of the Horn of Africa
white-backed black tit
Taxonomy articles created by Polbot